Pinus latahensis is an extinct species of conifer in the pine family Pinaceae. The species is known from fossil leaves found in the early Eocene deposits of northern Washington state, United States, and southern British Columbia, Canada.

Age
Pinus latahensis was first described by Edward W. Berry in 1929 based on a compression fossil recovered from shale outcrops in the Republic, Washington area.  When published the holotype specimen's type locality at Republic was misidentified as being an extension of the younger Latah Formation, located around the Spokane region, which was then considered to be of Late Miocene age.  Roland W. Brown identified that the Republic floras is of an older age and not part of the Latah formation in 1937. The Oligocene age was followed by Herman Becker (1961) while discussing the Oligocene Ruby Flora of Montana and Jack Wolfe (1965) in discussing the Miocene Fingerrock Wash Flora of Nevada.

In a written communication circa 1958, Brown again revised the age still older, stating fossils found in the area of Mount Elizabeth, northeast of Republic indicated an Oligocene age.  This age was used by R.L. Parker and J. A. Calkins  (1964) on their assessment of the Curlew Quadrangle of Ferry County.  Since then the fossil-bearing strata of the Klondike Mountain Formation have been radiometrically dated, to give a current estimate of the Ypresian, the mid stage of the early Eocene,.

Distribution and paleoenvironment
In his 1955 review of conifer fossils found in the Princeton coal fields of British Columbia, Chester A. Arnold noted the marked similarities between the Klondike Mountain and Allenby Formations and interpreted the shared taxa of the formations to indicated that the Klondike Mountain Formation was of Oligocene age like the Allenby Formation was thought to be at the time.  This similarity was also noted and commented on by Charles Miller (1975) who agreed the Republic and Princeton floras were coeval, and of Eocene age.

Both sites represent upland lake systems that were surrounded by a warm temperate ecosystem with nearby volcanism. The highlands likely had a mesic upper microthermal to lower mesothermal climate, in which winter temperatures rarely dropped low enough for snow, and which were seasonably equitable. The Okanagan highlands paleoforest surrounding the lakes have been described as precursors to the modern temperate broadleaf and mixed forests of Eastern North America and Eastern Asia. Based on the fossil biotas the lakes were higher and cooler then the coeval coastal forests preserved in the Puget Group and Chuckanut Formation of Western Washington, which are described as lowland tropical forest ecosystems. Estimates of the paleoelevation range between  higher than the coastal forests.

Estimates of the mean annual temperature have been derived from climate leaf analysis multivariate program (CLAMP) analysis and leaf margin analysis (LMA) of both the Princeton and Republic paleofloras.

In his assessment of the Driftwood Canyon Provincial Park fossils, originating from an unnamed formation in the Ootsa Lake Group and northernmost of the Eocene Okanagan highlands lake system, Rolf Ludvigsen identified the compression 5-needle fossils as P. latahensis.  At Driftwood creek, it co-occurs with the permineralized species Pinus driftwoodensis

Taxonomy and phylogeny
The type description given by Berry was brief, with an image of the holotype fossil printed in conjunction with three other pine species, Pinus macrophylla, Pinus monticolensis, and the dubious Pinus tetrafolia.  Specimen USNM P38082 of the Smithsonians National Museum of Natural History collection is the designated species holotype, though Berry did not list it as such in the type description.  Based on the erroneous assumption that the shales of Republic were part of the Latah formation Berry chose the species specific epithet latahensis.

In 1961, Becker discussed the taxonomy of P. latahensis in his monograph on the Oligocene Ruby basin flora of Southwestern Montana. Based on the assumption that the Klondike Mountain Formation was of Oligocene age, he placed several Ruby Basin fossils into a revised definition of P. monticolensis.  Becker noted that the name P. latahensis was chosen to honor a formation of different age and location then the type locality, and so he opted to suggest synonymy of P. latahensis into P. monticolensis as a whole plant species definition. He noted that taxonomic priority would favor the use of the name P. latahensis over P. monticolensis, as it was the first species described in the 1929 publication, but chose to ignore the rule.

Three years later Jack Wolfe (1964) also briefly discussed P. latahensis this time in reference to Miocene fossils found of the Fingerrock Wash Flora of Southwestern Nevada.  Wolfe took a more conservative approach to the fossils, and suggested that all Oligocene to modern fossils that resemble the living Pinus monticola should be considered to belong to that species. As such P. latahensis, along with four other fossil species were considered by Wolfe as junior synonyms of P. monticola.

Description
The needle sheath is deciduous, indicating a possible placement within the "hard" pines. In the type description, Berry noted the fossil examined to be very similar to both the living white pine and sugar pines.

References

†latahensis
Plants described in 1929
Fossil taxa described in 1929
Ypresian plants of North America
Extinct flora of North America
Klondike Mountain Formation